Give You the Ghost is the first studio album by American indie pop band Poliça. It was released by Totally Gross National Product on February 14, 2012. It was re-released by Mom + Pop Music together with a remix EP on August 14, 2012. It peaked at number 15 on the Billboard Heatseekers Albums chart.

Production
"Wandering Star" and "Lay Your Cards Out" feature vocals by Mike Noyce from Bon Iver. On the use of vocal effects, Leaneagh explained that "I'm not using Autotune to correct my voice, I'm using it to distort it, to catch the notes in between the melody line".

Critical reception

At Metacritic, which assigns a weighted average score out of 100 to reviews from mainstream critics, the album received an average score of 77, based on 19 reviews, indicating "generally favorable reviews".

Andrew Flanagan of Rolling Stone gave the album 3.5 out of 5 stars, commenting that Leaneagh's "focused, tender voice cascades over dense fields of minor key electronics, backed by funked-up bass and a swarm of percussion." He added, "It's the sound of heartbreak and celebration happening simultaneously." Harley Brown of Consequence of Sound stated that "the post-prog-rock percussion and mellifluous bass, along with Channy Leanagh's Auto-Tuned swan songs, re-shape the intersection of rhythm and blues."

The album was placed at number 40 on NMEs "50 Best Albums of 2012" list, as well as number 24 on Clashs "Top 40 Albums of 2012" list.

Track listing

Charts

References

External links
 

2012 debut albums
Poliça albums
Totally Gross National Product albums
Mom + Pop Music albums